John Audino (born June 5, 1953) is an American football coach and former player.  He is the head football coach at La Salle Institute in North Greenbush, New York, a position he had held since 2018.   Audino served as the head football coach at Kean University from 1990 to 1992 and at Union College in Schenectady, New York from 1992 to 2015.  Audino guided the Union Dutchmen to six Eastern College Athletic Conference (ECAC) Northwest Championship titles and four Liberty League titles.

Audino attended the University of Notre Dame and played on the football team as a running back. He received his undergraduate degree in 1975. Audino then pursued a master's degree at the University of Albany. While there, he worked under head coach Bob Ford as the Great Danes' special teams coordinator.

Audino then spent the next 13 years as an assistant coach at four different universities until he landed his first head coaching job at Kean University in Union, New Jersey in 1990. He only stayed for two seasons, compiling an 8–12 record, before accepting the newly-vacant head coaching position at Union.

Head coaching record

College football

References

External links
 Columbia profile

1953 births
Living people
American football running backs
Albany Great Danes football coaches
Columbia Lions football coaches
Kean Cougars football coaches
Kentucky Wildcats football coaches
Notre Dame Fighting Irish football players
Penn Quakers football coaches
Union Dutchmen baseball coaches
Union Dutchmen football coaches
High school football coaches in New York (state)
University at Albany, SUNY alumni
Sportspeople from Albany, New York
Coaches of American football from New York (state)
Players of American football from New York (state)